Yolandita is the twenty-first (21st) studio album by Puerto Rican singer Yolandita Monge, released in 1995. It marked the biggest radical change of sound and image for Monge, with a fresh and young approach that included long hair and a belly ring.

In the first six months of its release, more than 200,000 copies were sold in several Latin American countries. The album earned Gold status due to high sales and is available as a digital download at iTunes and Amazon with a different artwork.

Track listing

Credits and personnel

Vocals: Yolandita Monge
Producer: Gustavo Márquez
Executive Producer: Sergio Rozenblat
Arrangements: Paul Hoyle, Gustavo Márquez
Bass, Piano, Keyboards: Paul Hoyle
String Direction: Paul Hoyle
Drums: Orlando Hernández
Guitars: Ramón Stagnaro, Manny López ('Hay Amor')
Sax: Wayne Gutshall
Strings: Miami String Symphony
Violins: John Dipuccio, Joanie Faigen, Bruce Wethey, Gustavo Correa, Mei Mei Luo, Hui Fang Chen, Eddy Martínez
Violas: David Chapell, Debra Spring
Cello: Phil Lakosky

String Coordinator: Alfredo Oliva 
Chorus: George Noriega, Margie Cruz, Gustavo Márquez, Geannie Cruz, Paul Hoyle
Preproduction Studio: Extreme Music
Engineers: Lewis Martinee, David Briseño, Femio Hernández
Assistants: Chris Carol, Ken Schodron, Chris Spahr, Mark Gruver
Recorded & Mixed: Criteria Studio
Mastering: Fuller Sound
Photography: Fernando Báez
Graphic Design: Graff Group, Miami

Notes

Track listing and credits from album booklet.
Released in Cassette Format on 1995 (12692-4).
Released digitally by WEA-Latina on 18 January 2011 with different artwork.

Charts

Singles Charts

References

Yolandita Monge albums
1990 albums